Amadeodipterus is an extinct genus of lungfish which lived during the Devonian period. Fossils have been found in Central Australia.

References 

Prehistoric lungfish genera
Devonian bony fish
Prehistoric fish of Australia